Abdulaziz Hassan Bujaloof (born 27 February 1973) is a Qatari footballer. He competed in the men's tournament at the 1992 Summer Olympics.

References

External links
 

1973 births
Living people
Qatari footballers
Qatar SC players
Qatar Stars League players
Qatar international footballers
Olympic footballers of Qatar
Footballers at the 1992 Summer Olympics
2000 AFC Asian Cup players
Place of birth missing (living people)
Association football midfielders
Footballers at the 1994 Asian Games
Asian Games competitors for Qatar